Lim Yu-Jin (born ) is a South Korean female volleyball player. She was part of the South Korea women's national volleyball team.

She participated in the 2003 FIVB World Grand Prix, and the 2006 FIVB Volleyball World Grand Prix.
On club level she played for Korea Highway Corp. in 2006.

References

External links
 Profile at FIVB.org

1983 births
Living people
South Korean women's volleyball players
Place of birth missing (living people)